Craig Simmons (born 1982) is an Australian cricketer.

Craig Simmons may also refer to:

Craig Alexander Simmons (born 1969), Canadian engineer
Craig T. Simmons, Australian hydrogeologist